The 2009 Women's South American Volleyball Championship was the 28th edition of the Women's South American Volleyball Championship, organised by South America's governing volleyball body, the Confederación Sudamericana de Voleibol (CSV). It was held in Porto Alegre, Brazil from September 30 to October 4, 2009.

Teams

Squads

Preliminary round

Pool A

|}

Pool B

|}

Final round

Semifinals

Seventh place

Fifth place

Third place

First place

Final standing

Individual awards

Most Valuable Player

Best Spiker

Best Blocker

Best Server

Best Digger

Best Setter

Best Receiver

Best Libero

External links
Official website
CSV official website

Women's South American Volleyball Championships
South American Volleyball Championships
Volleyball
V
2009 in South American sport
September 2009 sports events in South America
October 2009 sports events in South America